Dyschirius chiricahuae is a species of ground beetle in the subfamily Scaritinae. It was described by Dajoz in 2004.

References

chiricahuae
Beetles described in 2004